Paul Clifford is an 1830 novel.

Paul Clifford may also refer to:

Paul Clifford, member of the British band, The Wonder Stuff
Paul Clifford (cricketer) (born 1976), cricketer